Lawrence Little (born 24 October 1967) is a New Zealand born former rugby union player. He played for  alongside his nephew and teammate Nicky Little at the 1999 Rugby World Cup.

Little made his debut for  against  at Nadi on 8 April 1995. His last match was against  on 24 August 1999.

References

External links
ESPN Scrum Profile

1967 births
Fijian rugby union players
Living people
Fiji international rugby union players
New Zealand people of Fijian descent
Fijian people of British descent
New Zealand people of British descent
Rugby union centres
Rugby union players from Waikato